Catedral Basílica Menor Nossa Senhora da Glória (or simply Catedral de Maringá Cathedral of Maringá) is a Roman Catholic cathedral located in downtown Maringá, Paraná, Brazil, reaching 124 m in height. It was completed in 1972 and is the tallest church building in the Americas and the 18th tallest in the world.

Architect José Augusto Bellucci was inspired by the Soviet Sputnik satellites when he designed the cathedral's modernist, conical shape.   The design was idealized by the archbishop Dom Jaime Luiz Coelho. 

The foundation stone, a piece of marble from St. Peter's Basilica in Rome blessed by Pope Pius XII, was laid on August 15, 1958. The church was built between July 1959 and May 10, 1972, the 25th anniversary of the city.

Gallery

External links
Cathedral of Maringá  
SkyscraperPage.com
Programa Meu Paraná, part one
Programa Meu Paraná, part two
Programa Meu Paraná, part three

Maringa
Religious buildings and structures in Paraná (state)
Maringá
Modernist architecture in Brazil
Basilica churches in Brazil
Roman Catholic churches completed in 1972
Towers in Brazil
20th-century Roman Catholic church buildings in Brazil